The Stockbrands and Kemmerer Department Store, located at 100 E. Rutledge in Yates Center, Kansas, was built in 1904.  It was listed on the National Register of Historic Places in 1985.

Kansas architect George P. Washburn designed the building.  It was erected by Grant Naylor.

It is also a key contributing building in the NRHP-listed Yates Center Courthouse Square Historic District.

It has also been known as Light Hardware Building.

References

Commercial buildings on the National Register of Historic Places in Kansas
Commercial buildings completed in 1904
Woodson County, Kansas